The 1993 Dartmouth Big Green football team was an American football team that represented Dartmouth College in Ivy League during the 1993 NCAA Division I-AA football season. The played their home games at Memorial Field in Hanover, New Hampshire. They were a member of the Ivy League. In its second season under head coach John Lyons, the team compiled a 7–3 record overall and a 6–1 mark against Ivy League opponents.

The team's statistical leaders included senior quarterback Jay Fiedler with 2,542 passing yards, senior wide receiver John Hyland with 1,076 receiving yards, and Pete Oberle with 660 rushing yards. Fiedler later played 10 seasons in the National Football League.

Five Dartmouth players were selected by conference coaches as first-team players on the 1993 All-Ivy League team: Fielder at quarterback; Hyland at wide receiver; Andy McDonald at offensive line; George Neos at linebacker; and Jim McGeehan at defensive back.

Schedule

References

Dartmouth
Dartmouth Big Green football seasons
Dartmouth Big Green football